The year 1730 in science and technology involved some significant events.

Astronomy
 The analemma is developed by the French astronomer Grandjean de Fouchy.

Mathematics
 James Stirling publishes Methodus differentialis, sive tractatus de summatione et interpolatione serierum infinitarum.

Physics
 The Reaumur scale is developed by French naturalist René Antoine Ferchault de Réaumur, with 0° = the freezing point of water and 80° = the boiling point.

Technology
 Joseph Foljambe of Rotherham, England, produces the iron-clad Rotherham swing plough.

Births
 April 15 – Moses Harris, English entomologist and engraver (died c. 1788)
 July 12 – Anna Barbara Reinhart, Swiss mathematician (died 1796)
 June 26 – Charles Messier, French astronomer (died 1817)
 August 12 – Edmé-Louis Daubenton, French naturalist (died 1785)
 December 8
 Johann Hedwig, Transylvanian-born German botanist (died 1799)
 Jan Ingenhousz, Dutch physiologist (died 1799)
 Maria Angela Ardinghelli, Italian scientific translator (died 1825)
 between 1730 and 1732 – William Hudson, English botanist (died 1793)

Deaths
 January 18 – Antonio Vallisneri, Italian physician and natural scientist (born 1661)
 April 21 - Jan Palfijn, Flemish surgeon and obstetrician  (born 1650)
 December 5 (bur.) – Alida Withoos, Dutch botanical artist (born c. 1661/1662)

References

 
18th century in science
1730s in science